This is the 101st season of Bolivian Football Regional Leagues also known as Primera A. In 2009 The team that was promoted to 1st division was Guabira from Santa Cruz after winning the 2009 Copa Simón Bolívar, and Ciclon came so close to be back in 1st division after Jorge Wilstermann suffered to win 3-2.

Santa Cruz

Liguilla Final

Relegation playoff

Tarija

Oruro

Cochabamba

La Paz

Chuquisaca

Beni

Potosi

Pando

References 

Reg